Mortimer is a Canadian unincorporated community, located in Kent County, New Brunswick. The community is situated in southeastern New Brunswick, Between Moncton and Rogersville. Mortimer is located mainly at the intersection of Route 126 and Route 116, also known as the Salmon River Road and the Beckwith Road.

History

Notable people

See also
List of communities in New Brunswick

Bordering communities
Harcourt, New Brunswick
Kent Junction, New Brunswick
Castaway, New Brunswick
Smiths Corner, New Brunswick

Communities in Kent County, New Brunswick